Waveland is a city located in Hancock County, Mississippi, United States, on the Gulf of Mexico. It is part of the Gulfport–Biloxi, Mississippi Metropolitan Statistical Area. The city of Waveland was incorporated in 1972. As of the 2010 census, the city had a population of 6,435. Waveland was nearly destroyed by Hurricane Camille on August 17, 1969, and by Hurricane Katrina on August 29, 2005.

The current mayor of Waveland is Jay Trapani.

History
Andrew Jackson once lived and owned land in Waveland on what is now known as Jackson Ridge. Much of Jackson Ridge later became Buccaneer State Park.

The Silver Slipper Casino opened on November 9, 2006.

Hurricane Camille
On August 17, 1969, Hurricane Camille made landfall at the tip of Louisiana before continuing on shore at Waveland. The storm heavily damaged the areas south of the Louisville and Nashville Railroad. Recovery efforts went on for nearly a decade. The town later erected a plaque commemorating the efforts of the volunteers who committed time and resources towards rebuilding.

Hurricane Katrina

The city of Waveland was "ground zero" of Hurricane Katrina's landfall on August 29, 2005. The city received massive damage and is still in the process of recovering and rebuilding. South of the CSXT mainline, the area was almost completely destroyed. The rest of the city took heavy flooding. In a news report, state officials said Waveland took a harder hit from the wind and water than any other town along the Gulf Coast, and that the town was obliterated.
Official reports stated that approximately 50 people died when Waveland was hit directly by the eyewall of Katrina and the  storm surge. Hurricane Katrina came ashore during the high tide of 8:01am, +2.2 feet more.

Hurricane Katrina damaged over 40 Mississippi libraries, gutting the Waveland Public Library, as a total loss, requiring a complete rebuild.

Recovery
A group of social activists seeking to better the lives of local residents, called the "Rainbow Family", arrived in Waveland soon after Hurricane Katrina. From early September to early December 2005, they ran the "New Waveland Cafe & Clinic" in the parking lot of Fred's Dept Store on Highway 90. The café provided free hot meals three times a day. The clinic was staffed by volunteer doctors and nurses from throughout the United States who saw over 5,000 patients during the duration, free of charge and dispensing free medications. Donations of medications and supplies came from a multitude of sources, with International Aid arranging the most donations. This was the first experience of the counter-culture Rainbow Family in running a disaster relief center. The Bastrop Christian Outreach Center also volunteered with the Rainbow Family.

Waveland Elementary School, which has served public school students in Grades K-3 (Grades 4-5 attend Second Street Elementary in nearby Bay St. Louis), was heavily damaged by Katrina. The students attending the school were educated in portable classrooms for the beginning of the 2006–2007 school year, pending a permanent solution.

The recovery of Waveland was due in part to the faith-based disaster recovery effort in and around the Waveland area. Shoreline Park Baptist Church in Waveland and Pastor Ed Murphy were vital to this effort, housing and feeding hundreds of missionaries from around the country for many years following Hurricane Katrina in what were referred to as "Pods for God". Shoreline Park Baptist Church directed the repair and, in some instances, the rebuilding of homes in the area for many years after the devastation.

Geography
Waveland is in southeastern Hancock County along the shore of Mississippi Sound, an embayment of the Gulf of Mexico. It is bordered to the north and northeast by the city of Bay St. Louis. U.S. Route 90 passes through the northern side of the city, leading east across the Bay of Saint Louis  to Gulfport and west  to New Orleans. Beach Boulevard (Mississippi Highway 606) passes along the shoreline, connecting Waveland with Buccaneer State Park and the communities of Lakeshore and Clermont Harbor.

Demographics

2020 census

As of the 2020 United States census, there were 7,210 people, 2,642 households, and 1,683 families residing in the city.

2000 census
As of the census of 2000, there were 6,674 people, 2,731 households, and 1,783 families residing in the city. The population density was 980.2 people per square mile (378.4/km). There were 3,442 housing units at an average density of 505.5 per square mile (195.1/km). The racial makeup of the city was 85.38% White, 11.21% African American, 0.49% Native American, 1.50% Asian, 0.03% Pacific Islander, 0.49% from other races, and 0.90% from two or more races. 2.02% of the population were Hispanic or Latino of any race.

There were 2,731 households, out of which 31.4% had children under the age of 18 living with them, 46.6% were married couples living together, 14.8% had a female householder with no husband present, and 34.7% were non-families. 29.1% of all households were made up of individuals, and 11.7% had someone living alone who was 65 years of age or older. The average household size was 2.43 and the average family size was 3.01.

In the city, the population was spread out, with 26.0% under the age of 18, 7.5% from 18 to 24, 28.3% from 25 to 44, 23.9% from 45 to 64, and 14.2% who were 65 years of age or older. The median age was 38 years. For every 100 females, there were 89.9 males. For every 100 females age 18 and over, there were 84.3 males.

The median income for a household in the city was $33,304, and the median income for a family was $38,438. Males had a median income of $29,762 versus $21,694 for females. The per capita income for the city was $16,413. 13.7% of the population and 11.6% of families were below the poverty line. Out of the total population, 15.6% of those under the age of 18 and 11.7% of those 65 and older were living below the poverty line.

Education
Most of Waveland is served by the Bay St. Louis-Waveland School District. Some portions are within the Hancock County School District.

All of Hancock County is in the service area of Pearl River Community College.

Notable people
 Johnny Dodds, jazz clarinetist
 Michael Grimm, singer; winner of season 5 of America's Got Talent
 Arthur Putnam, sculptor
 Bob Thorpe, former Major League Baseball right fielder

References

External links

 City of Waveland official website
 Mississippi's West Coast, official tourism site
 "Katrina town fights for survival", BBC report, December 2, 2005
 The Giving Circle, Inc., carrying out Operation: Waveland, MS
 Mission to Mississippi, group started in Wayland, Massachusetts to help rebuild Waveland
 Coastal90 Waveland, local online paper for Waveland post-Katrina

Cities in Mississippi
Cities in Hancock County, Mississippi
Gulfport–Biloxi metropolitan area
Populated coastal places in Mississippi